XOHM was the brand name Sprint Nextel Corporation was using to promote its WiMAX services, currently labelled by Sprint Corporation simply as 4G. Sprint was the first service provider in the United States, with its partner Clearwire, to announce the building of a mobile WiMAX network. The XOHM WiMAX mobile Internet initiative earned the Best of WiMAX World 2007 Award for Industry Innovation.

Chicago, Baltimore, and Washington, D.C. served as initial test markets, with Boston, Philadelphia, and Dallas to follow   before nationwide rollout; however Sprint announced delays of the soft launch at the 2008 CTIA. XOHM launched officially on September 29, 2008, in Baltimore and was deployed in other markets in 2009, 2010 and 2011 as Sprint 4G.

XOHM was merged with Clearwire. Sprint owns 54% of the firm, with ex-Clearwire shareholders owning 24%, and a consortium of Comcast, Time Warner, Intel, Google, and Bright House owning 22%. The new firm was named Clear. 

On December 1, 2008, Clearwire announced that XOHM will be phased out in 2009. XOHM will be replaced by the joint-Sprint/Clearwire brand, Clear.

A 500 million dollar WiMax project funded by taxpayers in New York City leases a 2.5GHz band for municipal applications.  The NY DoiTT has many former members of Nextel that are implementing this solution to improve municipal resource applications.  The system has great prospects for commercial applications with Clearwire which is also run on a 2.5 GHz platform.

On April 13, 2015, Sprint announced to its customers via email that they will cease operating the CLEAR 4G (WiMAX) Network and Clearwire Expedience Network on November 6, 2015, at 12:01am EST.

References

Consumer electronics brands
Sprint Corporation
Wi-Fi providers